Joseph John Caravello (born June 6, 1963) is a former American football tight end in the National Football League (NFL) for the Washington Redskins and the San Diego Chargers.  He played college football at Tulane University.

1963 births
Living people
American football tight ends
San Diego Chargers players
Washington Redskins players
Tulane Green Wave football players
Players of American football from Santa Monica, California
National Football League replacement players